Lady Caroline Catharine (or Catherine) Wilkinson ( Lucas; 1822–1881) was a Welsh botanist and author of Weeds And Wild Flowers: Their Uses, Legends, And Literature (1858).  She was born on 10 May 1822 in Llandebie, Carmarthenshire, Wales and died on 2 October 1881 in Llandovery, Carmarthenshire.

She was married to  Egyptologist John Gardner Wilkinson. Her husband was knighted in 1839 and as the wife of a knight, she was entitled to the customary title of Lady. She illustrated her husband's book, Desert Plants of Egypt.

References

1822 births
1881 deaths
19th-century British botanists
19th-century British women scientists
19th-century Welsh women artists
19th-century Welsh scientists
19th-century Welsh women writers
19th-century Welsh writers
People from Carmarthenshire
British botanical writers
British women botanists
Welsh women scientists
Welsh botanists
Wives of knights
Botanical illustrators
British women illustrators
Welsh illustrators